The Nexaer LS1 is an American light-sport aircraft, under development by Nexaer of Peyton, Colorado, first flown on 16 October 2006. The aircraft is intended to be supplied as a complete ready-to-fly-aircraft.

Design and development
The LS1 was designed to comply with the US light-sport aircraft rules. It features a cantilever low-wing, a two-seats-in-side-by-side configuration enclosed cockpit, fixed tricycle landing gear and a single engine in tractor configuration. The LS1 has a distinctively curved fuselage.

The aircraft is made from composites. Standard engines available are the  Rotax 912ULS,  Jabiru 2200,  Jabiru 3300,  Continental O-200 and the  Lycoming O-235 four-stroke powerplants.

Specifications (LS1)

References

External links

Light-sport aircraft
Single-engined tractor aircraft